Stefano Tonut (born 7 November 1993) is an Italian professional basketball player for Olimpia Milano of the Italian Lega Basket Serie A (LBA) and the EuroLeague. Standing at 1.94 m (6 ft. 4 in.), he plays at the shooting guard and point guard positions.

Professional career
Tonut came through the youth ranks of Monfalcone and Pallacanestro Trieste, before transferring again to Monfalcone, where he made his debut for the club’s men’s team in the amateur Italian third division during the 2010–11 campaign.

Tonut later returned to Pallacanestro Trieste where he played for the first time in the Serie A2 during the 2012-13 season. During the next two seasons, he was ranked as the fourth-best scorer in the league and the best Italian player of Serie A2 with averaging 19.2 points per game.

Tonut then joined Reyer Venezia of the professional Italian top-flight level league LBA in July 2015. In his first season with the team, he saw the court in 34 games in the LBA, scoring 2.8 points per outing. In the 2015–16 season, he marked his debut on the European club stage, participating in the European second tier EuroCup competition with Venezia.

In 2017 and 2019, Tonut won the LBA championship with Reyer.

In the 2020–21 season, Tonut won the LBA Most Valuable Player Award after averaging 15.6 points, 3.9 rebounds and 2.9 assists.

On June 25, 2022, Tonut signed with Olimpia Milano of the Italian Lega Basket Serie A (LBA) and the EuroLeague.

International career
Tonut made his debut with the under-20 Italian national basketball team during FIBA Europe Under-20 Championship on 9 July 2013, scoring 10 points with 2 steals in the winning game against Lithuania Under-20 Team.

In 2015 he officially entered into the Italian senior national basketball team.

References

External links 
 Stefano Tonut at fiba.com
 Stefano Tonut at eurocupbasketball.com
 Stefano Tonut at fibaeurope.com
 Stefano Tonut at eurobasket.com
 Stefano Tonut at legabasket.it 

1993 births
Living people
Basketball players at the 2020 Summer Olympics
Italian men's basketball players
Lega Basket Serie A players
Olympic basketball players of Italy
Pallacanestro Trieste players
People from Cantù
Point guards
Reyer Venezia players
Shooting guards
Sportspeople from the Province of Como